The 2021–22 Lebanese FA Cup was the 49th edition of the national football cup competition of Lebanon. It started with the round of 16 on 16 December 2021, and ended on 11 June 2022 with the final.

Lebanese Premier League side Ansar were the defending champions, having won the 2020–21 edition. They lost to cross-city rivals Nejmeh 2–1 in the final.

Teams

Round of 16

Quarter-finals

Semi-finals

Final

Bracket 
The following is the bracket which the Lebanese FA Cup resembled. Numbers in parentheses next to the score represents the results of a penalty shoot-out.

Season statistics

Top scorers

Most assists

References

External links 
 RSSSF
 Goalzz

 
Lebanese FA Cup seasons
FA Cup
Lebanese FA Cup